In zoology, an ambulacrum is an elongated area of the shell of an echinoderm in which a row of tube feet are arranged. It is pluralized as ambulacra. The area on the shell between ambulacra is known as an interambulacrum.

References

Echinoderm anatomy